The 2016 Pakistan Cup was a five-team limited overs (one-day) cricket tournament that took place in Faisalabad, Punjab, from 19 April to 1 May 2016. It was contested by teams representing Pakistan's four provinces and the capital. Squads for the tournament were selected based on a draft system.

Sarfraz Ahmed, Shoaib Malik, Younis Khan, Azhar Ali and Misbah-Ul-Haq led the sides from Sindh, Punjab, Khyber Pakhtunkhwa, Balochistan and Islamabad. Khyber Pakhtunkhwa won the tournament after defeating Punjab in the final by 151 runs.

Venue

Squads
The teams were selected by the captain and the coach through a draft which consisted of 150 players. Each team was able to select a squad of 15 players. The following players were selected in the draft:

Group stage

Points table

Source: ESPNcricinfo

Fixtures and results

Final

References

External links
 Series home at ESPN Cricinfo
 Tournament Schedule at PCB website

2016 in Pakistani cricket
2016 in Punjab, Pakistan
21st century in Faisalabad
April 2016 sports events in Pakistan
Cricket in Faisalabad
May 2016 sports events in Pakistan
2016